Sir John Serocold Paget Mellor, 2nd Baronet (6 July 1893 – 15 July 1986) was a British Conservative Party politician who served as member of parliament (MP) from 1935 until 1955, for constituencies in the West Midlands.

Mellor was first elected at the 1935 general election for the Tamworth constituency in Warwickshire, holding that seat through the ten-year wartime parliament. When Tamworth was abolished for the 1945 general election, he was elected for the new Sutton Coldfield constituency. Mellor was returned at the 1950 and 1951 elections, but stood down at the 1955 general election, when he was succeeded by the Conservative Geoffrey Lloyd.

References

External links 
 
 

1893 births
1986 deaths
Conservative Party (UK) MPs for English constituencies
Baronets in the Baronetage of the United Kingdom
UK MPs 1935–1945
UK MPs 1945–1950
UK MPs 1950–1951
UK MPs 1951–1955